The 2023 SWAC Men's Basketball Tournament was the postseason men's basketball tournament for the 2022–23 season in the Southwestern Athletic Conference (SWAC). The tournament was held from March 8–11, 2023. The tournament winner, Texas Southern, received an automatic invitation to the 2023 NCAA Division I Men's Basketball Tournament. The tournament was sponsored by Cricket Wireless.

Seeds 
Teams will be seeded by record within the conference, with a tie–breaker system to seed teams with identical conference records. Only the top eight teams in the conference will qualify for the tournament.

Schedule

Bracket

* Denotes overtime period

References 

2022–23 Southwestern Athletic Conference men's basketball season
SWAC men's basketball tournament
Basketball competitions in Birmingham, Alabama
College basketball tournaments in Alabama
SWAC men's basketball tournament
SWAC men's basketball tournament